Julius Wesseh Nah (born December 1, 1988 in Grand Kru) is a Liberian footballer (midfielder) playing currently for Zesco United.

External links 
Julius Wesseh Nah - www.times.co
Julius Wesseh Nah - www.starradio.org

1988 births
Living people
Liberian footballers
Association football midfielders
ZESCO United F.C. players
People from Grand Kru County
Liberia international footballers